The Light heavyweight competition was the third-highest weight class featured  at the 2009 World Amateur Boxing Championships, and was held at the Mediolanum Forum. Heavyweights were limited to a maximum of 81 kilograms in body mass.

Medalists

Seeds

  Abdelhafid Benchabla  (third round)
  Elshod Rasulov (final)
  Kenny Egan (quarterfinals)
  Dinesh Kumar  (quarterfinals)
  Artur Beterbiyev (champion)
  Imre Szellő  (first round)
  Jose Larduet  (semifinals)
  Daugirdas Semiotas (second round)

Draw

Finals

Top Half

Section 1

Section 2

Bottom Half

Section 3

Section 4

See also
Boxing at the 2008 Summer Olympics – Light heavyweight

External links
Draw

Light heavyweight